Bacunayagua is a Cuban village and consejo popular ("people's council", i.e. voting district) of the municipality of Santa Cruz del Norte, in Mayabeque Province. In 2011 it had a population of 3,371.

Geography
The small northern Cuban settlement was established on the side of the important Vía Blanca (road), where a deep canyon cuts the coastal hills between the Yumuri Valley and the Straits of Florida coast. It marks the boundary between the Mayabeque Province and Matanzas Province.

Transport

Bacunayagua Bridge
Cubans consider it one of the seven wonders of Cuban civil engineering . It was designed by Luis Sáenz Duplace and built under the leadership of Civil Engineer Manuel (Manolo) Arvesu. A restaurant with an observation deck is built on the Havana side, while the coastal cove on the Matanzas side includes a campground.
 
The bridge used to divide the provinces of La Habana and Matanzas, but after the reorganization of 2010, it now divides Matanzas Province from the new Mayabeque Province (the island's smallest, except for the city of Havana itself).

See also
Vía Blanca
Arcos de Canasí
Jibacoa
Boca de Jaruco
Camilo Cienfuegos (Hershey)

References

External links

Populated places in Mayabeque Province
Geography of Mayabeque Province